Harlee McBride (born November 20, 1948) is a retired American actress. She is best known for the role of Cynthia Chatterley in Young Lady Chatterley and Young Lady Chatterley II, and as Dr. Alyssa Dyer on Homicide: Life on the Street.

Personal life 

She married actor Richard Belzer in 1985. They met in Los Angeles in 1981, when she was 33 and divorced, with two daughters, Bree and Jessica. McBride, who had been seen in Playboy magazine four years earlier as part of that year's sex-in-cinema feature, in conjunction with Young Lady Chatterley, was appearing in TV commercials for the auto maker Ford and acting in free theater, when she met Belzer at the suggestion of a friend. During the 1980s, she worked as a secretary at Disneyland.

On October 12, 2014, McBride was disruptive on an Air France flight from New York to Paris. She was yelling and threw a tray of food. She was handcuffed to her seat by cabin crew. The pilots made an emergency landing in Gander, Newfoundland and Labrador, where she spent two nights in a local jail cell until her CAD$10,000 bail was posted.  In May 2016, a Gander judge ordered McBride to pay $26,433 in restitution and $10,000.

Filmography

Film

Television

References

External links

1948 births
Living people
American film actresses
Actresses from Los Angeles
American television actresses
American stage actresses
20th-century American actresses
21st-century American women